Ivana Spagna (born 16 December 1954), also known simply as Spagna, is an Italian singer and songwriter. She is best known for her worldwide hit song "Easy Lady" released in 1986.

Career 

Spagna started her career singing in English and in the early 1980s she provided vocals (with Angela Parisi) and wrote songs for an Italo disco duo called Fun Fun; as well as writing songs and singing for many other dance music projects like Baby's Gang until 1986, when she embarked on a solo career.

Spagna's debut single "Easy Lady", released in 1986, was a success across Europe. In 1987, she released "Call Me", which topped the European Hot 100 Singles chart, and reached number two in Italy and on the UK Singles Chart. It also reached number 13 on the US Hot Dance Club Play chart. Her debut album, Dedicated to the Moon, was released the same year and sold over 500,000 copies.

After the UK hit "Every Girl and Boy" and a dance-rock album, You Are My Energy (1988), Spagna moved to Santa Monica, California, and recorded her third album No Way Out (1991). This album featured a song written by Diane Warren ("There's a Love"), and two singles ("Love at First Sight" and "Only Words") which peaked at #5 on the Italian chart. The album was certified Platinum (over 100,000 copies sold).

In 1993, Spagna moved back to Europe, and recorded Matter of Time, featuring the two successful Eurodance singles, "Why Me" (number 10 in Italy) and "I Always Dream About You" (number five in Italy).

In 1995, after the release of "Lady Madonna" (number four in Italy), Spagna started singing in her native Italian. After achieving a great success in Italy with the Italian version of Elton John's "Circle of Life" ("Il cerchio della vita"), featured in the Italian soundtrack of the Disney film The Lion King, she took part in the Sanremo Festival, the most important Italian song contest, ranking 3rd in 1995 with the song "Gente Come Noi". Her first album in Italian, Siamo in due, sold over 350,000 copies and became the best-selling album by a female singer in Italy that year.

From that year onwards, Spagna released many successful albums sung in Italian (including hit singles such as "Siamo in due", "E io penso a te", "Lupi solitari", "Indivisibili", "Dov'eri", "Il bello della vita-World Cup Song", "Con il tuo nome") until 2003, when she left Sony Music in order to sing in English again. She signed to an independent Swiss record label (B&G), and recorded Woman, a dance-pop album featuring eight new songs in English, two in Spanish and one in French. The album spawned three singles; "Never Say You Love Me", "Woman" and "Do It With Style". In 2004 a new remixed version of "Easy Lady" was released.

Spagna's albums and singles have sold a total of over 15 million copies worldwide, for which she has been awarded the "Disco d'oro alla carriera" (Gold certification for the career) by the Italian Federation of the Music Industry (FIMI) in 2006. In February 2006 she took part in the Sanremo Festival again, with the song "Noi non possiamo cambiare", and in May 2006 ranked third in the Italian reality television program, Music Farm.

In 2008 Spagna was honoured with a honoris causas degree by the University of Malta

In February 2009, Spagna released the EP Lola & Angiolina Project, in collaboration with the Italian singer Loredana Bertè. The first single from this was the rock ballad "Comunque Vada".

In 2012 Spagna published the English language album, Four, with artists Brian Auger, Eumir Deodato, Dominic Miller, Lou Marini, Gregg Kofi Brown, Fabrizio Bosso and Ronnie Jones.

In 2014 Spagna returned to dance music, releasing the single The Magic of Love and then in 2015 two more singles: Baby Don't Go and Straight to Hell, with a video inspired by The Curious Case of Benjamin Button.

In 2019 Spagna released "Cartagena", a pop song in collaboration with Jay Santos. The song sold 200.000 copies, her highest selling single since the late 90s.

Discography

References

 Guinness Book of British Hit Singles (16th Edition) -

External links 

 Official website

1954 births
Living people
People from the Province of Verona
Italian women singer-songwriters
Italian singer-songwriters
Italian Italo disco musicians
English-language singers from Italy